Koziołek Matołek (Matołek the Billy-Goat) is a fictional character created by Kornel Makuszyński (story) and Marian Walentynowicz (art) in one of the first and most famous Polish comics back in 1933. It became a cult classic, popular since its creation till today, and becoming an important part of the canon of Polish children's literature.

History
Makuszyński and Walentynowicz created four books: 120 przygód Koziołka Matołka ("120 adventures of Koziołek Matołek"), Druga księga przygód Koziołka Matołka ("second book of adventures of Koziołek Matołek"), Trzecia księga przygód Koziołka Matołka ("third book of adventures of Koziołek Matołek") and Czwarta księga przygód Koziołka Matołka ("fourth book of adventures of Koziołek Matołek").

Pacanów, the setting of the comic, is a real town in Poland. Once when Makuszyński and Walentynowicz were sitting in a coffee house in Kraków, they spotted a sad looking man sipping a drink at a nearby table. They asked him why he looked so gloomy, and he told them that he came from the small town of Pacanów and was wondering how to help the town prosper. Makuszyński and Walentynowicz decided then to help him by popularizing the small town in their books.

Story
The stories center around the quest that Matołek, an anthropomorphic goat, undertakes: to find Pacanów, a town where it is rumoured they make shoes for goats. Matołek's adventures are amusing if sometimes surreal. The titular hero is nice, naive, clumsy, laughable and not very bright — in many regards similar to another famous children's story character, Winnie the Pooh by A.A. Milne. As an adventure comic strip the stories are roughly contemporaneous with characters such as Rupert Bear and Tintin and Milou. Matołek's search for Pacanów takes him to many corners of the Earth, from Africa to the Wild West.

The stories have visible patriotic undertones, from Matołek's colors (white fur and red shorts, evoking the flag of Poland) to his homesick feelings for Poland, which appear when he finds himself in far-away places.

Form
The comic has a specific format: each page is divided into regular, rectangular frames with each illustration accompanied by a rhythmical 8-syllabical quatrain. The most popular illustrations come from the third edition, the first two had a different style of art.

Influence

The comic has influenced many generations of Poles, and some of its phrases have penetrated into the Polish language itself, with expressions like 'w Pacanowie kozy kują' (In Pacanów, they shoe goats), 'pacan' and 'matoł' (slowpoke, dummy).

From 1969 to 1971 an animated series Dziwne przygody Koziołka Matołka (Strange adventures of Koziołek Matołek) was made by Studio Miniatur Filmowych. The animated version was released in a series on 3 DVDs in 2002 and is available internationally; although there are no English language subtitles, the amount of dialogue is very limited. The original comic book has not been translated. Currently Studio Miniatur Filmowych has started work on a full-length animated film about Koziołek Matołek.

There are also four educational games for small children, 'Koziołek Matołek idzie do szkoły' (Koziołek Matołek goes to school), 'Koziołek Matołek wynalazca' (Koziołek Matołek the inventor), 'Szkoła Koziołka Matołka' (The school of Koziołek Matołek) and 'Wesołe przedszkole Koziołka Matołka' (The happy kindergarten of Koziołek Matołek)

The series has also been adopted into a theater production for a younger audience.

In 2003 Polish minister of culture Waldemar Dąbrowski organized the celebrations of Koziołek Matołek's 70th birthday in Pacanów.

See also
 Rupert Bear
 Tintin and Milou

References
 Koziołek Matołek wraca na ekrany
Adventures of Koziołek Matołek on Rotten Tomatoes
Really Getting Your Goat, Warsaw Voice, 12 June 2003
Kidsville, Warsaw Voice, 29 May 2003

External links
 Europejskie Centrum Bajki im.Koziołka Matołka w Pacanowie
 Festiwal Kultury Dziecęcej, Pacanów 2006
 Z Koziołkiem Matołkiem za pan brat

Fiction about goats
Fictional Polish people
Fairy tale stock characters
Comics adapted into animated series
Comics adapted into television series
Comics adapted into plays
1933 comics debuts
Comics characters introduced in 1933
Adventure comics
Fantasy comics
Text comics
Male characters in comics
Fictional anthropomorphic characters
Comics about animals